The gyroradius (also known as radius of gyration, Larmor radius or cyclotron radius) is the radius of the circular motion of a charged particle in the presence of a uniform magnetic field. In SI units, the non-relativistic gyroradius is given by

The angular frequency of this circular motion is known as the gyrofrequency, or cyclotron frequency, and can be expressed as

in units of radians/second.

Variants

It is often useful to give the gyrofrequency a sign with the definition

or express it in units of hertz with

For electrons, this frequency can be reduced to

In cgs-units the gyroradius

and the corresponding gyrofrequency

include a factor , that is the velocity of light, because the magnetic field is expressed in units .

Relativistic case
For relativistic particles the classical equation needs to be interpreted in terms of particle momentum :

where  is the Lorentz factor. This equation is correct also in the non-relativistic case.

For calculations in accelerator and astroparticle physics, the formula for the gyroradius can be rearranged to give

Derivation
If the charged particle is moving, then it will experience a Lorentz force given by

Notice that the direction of the force is given by the cross product of the velocity and magnetic field. Thus, the Lorentz force will always act perpendicular to the direction of motion, causing the particle to gyrate, or move in a circle. The radius of this circle, can be determined by equating the magnitude of the Lorentz force to the centripetal force as

Rearranging, the gyroradius can be expressed as

Thus, the gyroradius is directly proportional to the particle mass and perpendicular velocity, while it is inversely proportional to the particle electric charge and the magnetic field strength. The time it takes the particle to complete one revolution, called the period, can be calculated to be

Since the period is the reciprocal of the frequency we have found

and therefore

See also
 Beam rigidity
 Cyclotron
 Magnetosphere particle motion
 Gyrokinetics

References

Plasma physics
Accelerator physics
Kinematic properties